Bawlf is a village in Alberta, Canada. 

Bawlf may also refer to:
Bawlf (Blackwells) Airport, Alberta, Canada
Billy Bawlf (1881–1972), Canadian ice hockey player
Nicholas Bawlf (1849–1914), a figure in the Canadian grain trade
Nick Bawlf (1884–1947), Canadian ice hockey player